Gutowski  (feminine Gutowska) is a Polish surname. It is a surname of a Polish szlachta (nobility) which is one of the oldest recorded names of Polish nobility. The first surviving record found is in 1241 as the Chancellor of Poland, Wawrzęta Gutowski.

Most of the families belong to the Clan of Ślepowron (nobility), one of the original clans, located south of Warsaw, in the Duchy of Masovia. Than later the name was spread into 4 other clans.

Polish nobility is not like any other nobility. One is they don't get letters of patents from a king, the state can not remove nobility, the nobility is given full title to all decedents, male and female if they follow the rules of the nobility.

Notables 
 Ace Gutowsky (1909–1976), American football fullback
 Adalbert Gutowski (1753–1812), Austrian painter
 Antoni Gutowski (19th century), castellan of Grabowiec
 Bob Gutowski (1935–1960), US - Polish American pole vaulter
 Boleslaw Gutowski (*1888 † 1966), Polish doctor / physiologist, professor / dean at the Royal (Dick) Veterinary College in Edinburgh
 Gene Gutowski (1925–2016), Polish-born European and U.S. motion picture and theater producer, noted sculptor and author. Producer of several of Roman Polanski's early films. Co-producer of The Pianist
 Herbert S. Gutowsky US-American chemist
 Ignaz von Gutowski (19th century), Prussian politician, member of the Prussian Parliament
 Jacek Gutowski, Polish weightlifter
 Jakob Gutowski from 1733 to 1737, castellan of Rozan and Makow Mazowiecki
 Jerzy Marian Gutowski
 Julian Gutowski (1823 - 1890) member of Parliament (1861-1865) in Austria, from 1867 to 1870 mayor of Nowy Sacz / Neu Sandenz 
 Krystyna Gutowska (born 1947),  Polish philosopher
 Maciej Gutowski (1931-1998), Polish art historian
 Małgorzata Gutowska-Adamczyk Polish author, historien, screenwriter, journalist
 Mateusz Gutowski (1759-1804), Polish Catholic canon (lat. clerici canonici)
 Michał Gutowski (14 September 1910 - 23 August 2006), Polish brigadier general, sportsman
 Prokop Gutowski (17th century), Polish Catholic, cathedral canon (lat. clerici canonici)
 Robert Gutowski (1981-present), philosopher, historian, polymath
 Samuel Gutowski from 1607 to 1620 governor of Radom - District, from 1623 - royal court official 
 Simon Gutowski  (1627–1685), Polish organ builder, composer and capellmeister of the Tsar of Russia
 Teofil Gutowski (1835–1891), Polish organist and composer
 Walerian Gutowski (1629–1693), Polish provincial superior and royal preacher of the Franciscan Order
 Wawrzęta Gutowski (unknown), Chancellor of Poland 1241-1243
 Wawrzyniec Gutowski (1757–1833), Polish Catholic, canon of the cathedral and bishop
 Wojciech Gutowski (1784–1788), castellan of Plock

Literature 

Polish noble families
Clan of Ślepowron
Polish-language surnames